Benjamin Kirby "Ben" Tennyson, commonly known as Ben 10, is a fictional superhero and the title protagonist of the Ben 10 franchise. An initially normal 10-year-old boy, until, during his summer vacation, he encountered the Omnitrix, an alien device in the shape of a watch, which initially allowed him to transform into 10 different aliens, but he unlocks more as the franchise progresses. Ben, along with his cousin Gwen and grandfather Max, began to use their powers to become a hero, occasionally arresting common criminals, but was quickly drawn into fighting supervillains as well. At some point, for unknown reasons, Ben removed the Omnitrix and retired from his hero career for the next four years. Ben returned to active duty after his grandfather's disappearance, and along with Gwen and former enemy and rival Kevin Levin, stopped the Highbreed invasion, as well as defeating Vilgax, destroying the Omnitrix in the process.

After that, Ben starts using the Ultimatrix, capable of evolving his aliens, in addition to having his identity revealed, becoming famous not only on Earth, in particular his hometown Bellwood, but also in the universe. He stopped Aggregor and Dagon's plans and gained a new Omnitrix. After that, Gwen and Kevin leave for college, and Ben gains a new partner, Rook Blonko, in addition to being hunted by Khyber. Afterwards, Ben engages in a Multiversal War against Eon and Vilgax, and a Time War against Maltruat.

In 2016, the character underwent a reboot, where he returned to being a 10-year-old boy who travels across the country during his summer vacation, along with his grandfather Max and cousin Gwen, and uses his powers to face supervillains.

He was created for Ben 10 (2005–2008), in which his 10-11 year-old voice is voiced by Tara Strong. Yuri Lowenthal substituted for Tara Strong for Ben's 15-16 year-old voice in the three sequel series Ben 10: Alien Force (2008–2010), Ben 10: Ultimate Alien (2010–2012) and Ben 10: Omniverse (2012–2014), with Strong returning to voice Ben in Ultimate Alien in one episode as well as Omniverse in flashbacks, Ben Tennyson's alternate dimension counterpart: Ben 23, and in the rebooted Ben 10 (2016–2021), with Lowenthal returning for the latter's 2021 series finale. His future self is voiced by Fred Tatasciore (OS), Sean Donnellan (UA) and Judd Nelson (OV). In his live action version, he was played by Graham Phillips (RAT) and Ryan Kelley (AS).

Concept and creation 

Ben 10 was created by Man of Action (consisting of comic book creators Duncan Rouleau, Joe Casey, Joe Kelly, and Steven T. Seagle) and was produced by Cartoon Network Studios. The group worked on the concept of Ben 10 and its title character roughly three years before Cartoon Network picked up the series. Dave Johnson also helped in the design development. Early on in development, it was decided that a villain would be within the Omnitrix. After Ghostfreak was created the creators added dialogue into the first season to give the audience that there is something more to Ghostfreak. Originally Cannonbolt, the 11th alien transformation in the series, was going to be in the original set of aliens, but was replaced with Ghostfreak.

When doing test animations for the series the first alien transformation to be tested was Four Arms. It was the most popular transformation out of all the aliens for "Man of Action". Many of the unused designs for Upchuck were recycled in the episode "Ben 10,000" as two of Ben's aliens "Spitter" and "Arctiguana", and as villain Sploot. Steven E. Gordon worked on an early version of the series. His concept work reveals that Ben Tennyson was originally going to be a red-headed young boy. Gordon also has early designs of the Omnitrix which look more like a watch than the final version, as well as different designs and names for the alien transformations. Some of the early names for the Omnitrix transformations were "StrongGuy", "Inferno", "RazorJaws", "Dragonfly", "Plantguy", and "Digger". Some of the early designs for the aliens are more human and superheroic, similar to Dial H For Hero. The character's middle name, Kirby, was named as a reference to comic book artist Jack Kirby. Initial concepts for Ben's Alien Force and Ultimate Alien designs were made by Glen Murakami. His head and hair were reworked by Glenn Wong, who also gave him his green jacket, while colors were added by Chris Hooten.

Personality 

Initially cocky, childish, and selfish, Ben's immaturity and attention-seeking behavior often led him to joke around, regardless of the situation. His allies often criticized his attitude, unaware of the fact that he used humor to mask his fears. Despite some childish attitude, he was heroic, caring and generally good-natured, always willing to save others at any time even at the risk of himself.

Over the years, Ben has displayed good leadership skills, as well as the ability to adapt his attitude to a situation, becoming serious when it's called for. He became more mature, responsible and sensible. He's kind-hearted, willing to sacrifice even his own life for others. His idealistic views and unwillingness to compromise his values – aspects condemned by Azmuth, yet commended by others – sometimes drive him to act against reason, such as helping his enemies if they need it (most remarkably Vilgax). Professor Paradox has praised Ben's good nature, going so far as to say he had the gift to make the right choices at the right moments even Azmuth himself states that Ben ultimately always does the right thing. Also, Ben doesn't give up and wouldn't let anyone stop him from doing what's right for those in need, especially his family, friends and mentors, or to bring enemies down, even when he once got a broken arm.

However, when Ben fails to save someone, or if someone gets hurt because of his failures, he becomes angry and much more violent. Perhaps the most notable of these instances is when Kevin willingly mutated himself to succeed where Ben had failed and stop Aggregor, Ben was set on killing Kevin, even fighting Gwen when she refused to help him. He also threatened to hunt down and destroy the Forever Knights once making Driscoll promise to cease the hunting of aliens.

Though often stated to be silly or unintelligent because of his immaturity, Ben is cunning and resourceful when needed, quickly adapting when the Omnitrix doesn't provide him with the alien he wanted.

Later on, Ben starts thinking of himself as more of a superhero than a Plumber, often remarking that he's not a cop, but a superhero. Although he once again became cocky, he retained his selfless and heroic nature.

As Ben 10,000:

At some point in his future, Ben became so strict, cynical, and serious about the hero business to the point where it is almost obsessive. He rarely turned back to his human form, spending most of his time in alien form, skimming his patrol routes, and brutalizing criminals as quickly as he could. He also stopped naming his aliens. He stayed this serious for years until he met and had a talk with his younger self, after which Ben lightens up and he starts naming his aliens again.
He likes to spend time with his son and, while he tries to be close to him, Ben sometimes doubts his abilities as a parent and becomes over-protective. He can also be somewhat obtuse, not realizing where his son got his attitude from and grasping the obvious. While Ben is a lot older, he still has a teasing side, jokingly calling his cousin Gwen "dweeb".

Ben possesses a commendable amount of bravery and courage. Despite his change to a more light-hearted and relaxed person, Ben 10,000 has a ferocious temper that returns him to the more aggressive and grim personage he displayed before.

Fictional character biography

Ben 10 (2005–2008) 

The series primarily centers around Ben Tennyson (Tara Strong), a ten-year-old boy on a cross-country summer vacation with his cousin Gwen (Meagan Smith) and grandfather Max (Paul Eiding). During first night camping in Max's RV affectionately they call "The Rustbucket," and Ben goes out walking into a nearby forest, and in this forest, he realizes this crashed meteor and which is an alien pod with a mysterious watch-style device named the Omnitrix. This device soon permanently attaches itself to his wrist giving him the ability to transform into a variety of alien life-forms each with its own unique skills and powers. With his newfound superpowers, and later discovery of Max's career in a secret intergalactic government organization called The Plumbers, Ben has to learn the responsibilities of being a hero. During their vacation, the Tennysons are attacked by various enemies ranging aliens and criminals to supernatural entities, including Vilgax (Steve Blum), Sixsix and Kraab (Dee Bradley Baker and Billy West), Zs'Skayr (Steve Blum), Kevin Levin (Michael Reisz and Charlie Schlatter), The Forever Knights (Richard Doyle), Dr. Animo (Dwight Schultz), Hex (Khary Payton), and Zombozo (John Kassir).

Ben 10: Alien Force (2008–2010) 

Set five years after the end of the original series, Ben Tennyson (Yuri Lowenthal), now a teenager, once again dons the Omnitrix to protect the earth and other parts of the universe from villainous alien activity. The storyline is notable for having matured the characters and taken a darker tone with more complex plots, more characters dying, and much less humor, Ben himself having matured dramatically and gained strength, leadership, and wisdom. The Omnitrix itself, a wristwatch-shaped device, allows Ben to transform into numerous alien forms, thereby inheriting the unique abilities of that alien race. At the age of fifteen, Ben fills the role of leader after Grandpa Max mysteriously disappears. The powerful Omnitrix has recalibrated, giving him access to a new set of alien heroes that are much stronger and more powerful than those in the original series, teaming up once again with his cousin Gwen (Ashley Johnson) and former enemy Kevin (Greg Cipes).

Ben 10: Ultimate Alien (2010–2012) 

Set several weeks after the destruction of the Omnitrix in the series finale of the previous series, Ben Tennyson, now sixteen years old, must learn to master the powers of the Ultimatrix, a modified version of the Omnitrix which has the ability to evolve Ben's alien forms into much more powerful versions known as "ultimate forms." The series begins with the exposure of Ben's secret identity to the world by Jimmy Jones (Scott Menville), a young internet conspiracy theorist who deduces his identity by studying alien sightings in Ben's hometown of Bellwood. Ben's exposure polarizes public opinion, with younger fans idolizing him, and adults, in particular news anchor Will Harangue (John DiMaggio) deriding Ben as a menace to society. Ben is now forced to adjust to a new life that not only involves battling the forces of evil alongside his cousin Gwen Tennyson and his friend Kevin Levin, but also his struggle against the pitfalls of his new-found fame. Ben 10/Generator Rex: Heroes United, a one-hour crossover with fellow Man of Action series Generator Rex, aired on November 25, 2011, on Cartoon Network, featuring Ben travelling to the dimension in which Generator Rex takes place.

Ben 10: Omniverse (2012–2014) 

The storylines alternate between that of eleven-year-old Ben (one year after the original series) and sixteen-year-old Ben (several months after Ben 10: Ultimate Alien). After Gwen leaves for college and Kevin leaves to be closer to her, sixteen-year-old Ben gets a new partner, a rookie by-the-book alien plumber named Rook Blonko (Bumper Robinson). On a mission to explore a secret underground alien city named Undertown, Ben explores the quirkier side of things in the alien underground and discovers that enemies from his past are looking for a rematch. In "T.G.I.S.", it is revealed that the Ben 10 universe shares the same universe with The Secret Saturdays.

Ben 10 (2016–2021) 

Building on the franchise about the kid hero Ben Tennyson, Ben 10 introduces a re-imagined Ben, his cousin Gwen, and Grandpa Max, as they travel the country during summer vacation. When Ben finds the Omnitrix, a mysterious watch that transforms him into 10 different aliens, a world of extraterrestrial superpowers opens up to him, encountering villains such as Vilgax, The High Override, Forever Knight and Kevin 11. Set in an alternate universe from previous series, the new Benita encounters the Ben from the previous series in the series finale "Alien X-Tinction", teaming up with him and several other versions of Ben and Gwen to stop the titular Alien X from stealing their Omnitrixes and taking over the multiverse.

Portrayal

Voice actors 
10-year-old Ben is voiced by Tara Strong in the original Ben 10 series which aired from 2005 to 2008. She would later return as the 10-year-old Ben in Ben 10: Ultimate Alien in the episode "The Forge of Creation" and reprises her role as 11-year-old Ben in flashback episodes of Ben 10: Omniverse, which aired from 2012 to 2014. She reprises the role of the 10-year-old Ben Tennyson in the 2016 reboot. Strong voiced the 10-year-old Ben in all series to date except Ben 10: Alien Force, where 10-year-old Ben never spoke.

Ben 10: Alien Force, the sequel series to the original, introduces teenage Ben (15 years old), voiced by Yuri Lowenthal (replacing Strong). Lowenthal would later reprise his role as teenage Ben (now 16 years old) in Ben 10: Ultimate Alien and Ben 10: Omniverse (sharing the role in the latter with Tara Strong, who voices 11-year-old Ben). He cameos as an elderly Ben in the 2016 reboot in the episode "The 11th Alien: Part 2", and later returns to voice the aforementioned 15 and 16-year-old versions of Ben in "Alien X-Tinction".

Live action 
He is portrayed by Graham Phillips as the 10-year-old Ben in Ben 10: Race Against Time and was played by Ryan Kelley as the teenage Ben in Ben 10: Alien Swarm.

Notes

See also 
 List of Ben 10 characters
 Robby Reed and Chris King and Vicki Grant

References 

Ben 10
Animated human characters
Child superheroes
Teenage superheroes
Fictional alien hunters
Fictional shapeshifters
Fictional extraterrestrial–human hybrids
Male characters in animated series
American superheroes
Male superheroes
Child characters in animated television series
Teenage characters in television
Television characters introduced in 2005
Animated characters introduced in 2005
Cartoon Network Studios superheroes
Characters created by Steven T. Seagle